Newman is an unincorporated community in southern Jefferson County, United States.

History
Newman was laid out in 1867.

A post office was opened in Newman in 1868 and remained in operation until it was closed in 1969.

See also
 Perry Lake and Perry State Park

References

Further reading

External links
 Jefferson County maps: Current, Historic, KDOT

Unincorporated communities in Jefferson County, Kansas
Unincorporated communities in Kansas